Sir Henry Charles Kerruish  OBE LLD CP MLC (23 July 1917 – 2 August 2003) was a Manx politician who was the first President of Tynwald and, as Speaker of the House of Keys from 1962 to 1990, was the longest-serving Speaker in any Parliament in the Commonwealth.  He was also the first Chairman of the Executive Council, the forerunner of the present Chief Minister of the Isle of Man, from 1961 to 1967. This made him the first Manx person to fulfil an executive role on the Isle of Man.  Previously the Lieutenant Governor had exercised all executive power. He was a keen supporter of Scouting on the Isle of Man, often offering his own lands for camping.

During the 1986 Chernobyl disaster, a westerly wind brought much contaminated fallout across Europe, including the Isle of Man. Charles Kerruish disdained from culling his mouton based around Snaefell. He subsequently sold his slaughtered animals to the Manx population for consumption.

Unlike some of his contemporaries at the time, he devotedly supported the un-elected Legislative Council.

References

Manx politicians
1917 births
2003 deaths
Chairmen of the Executive Council of the Isle of Man
Knights Bachelor
Officers of the Order of the British Empire
Politicians awarded knighthoods
People educated at St Ninian's High School, Douglas